Emerge Desktop is a replacement shell for Windows XP (both Home and Professional editions), Windows Vista and Windows 7 written in C++, primarily developed with the MinGW compiler, and is licensed under the GNU General Public License, Version 3.

Applets 
Most of the Emerge Desktop applets are capable of being run as both standalone as well as being integrated, however the core applet (emergeCore) must be running in order for each applet to communicate with another in the suite. Each applet is aimed at replacing or extending a functionality of the default Windows shell and offers various configuration and visual customization features.

Core Applets

emergeTasks 
emergeTasks is the 'Tasks' applet for Emerge Desktop. It displays an icon for each running task in a movable, resizable window.

emergeTray 
emergeTray is the 'system tray' applet of Emerge Desktop. It displays the system icons in a movable, resizable window.

emergeWorkspace 
emergeWorkspace is the desktop component of Emerge Desktop. It provides the mouse RightClick and MiddleClick menus.

Additional Applets 
emergeDesktop has several additional applets that can be used. These are all standalone applets and can be run independently of the three core applets above. They can also be run on top of Windows Explorer or any other Windows Shell Replacement.

emergeCommand 
emergeCommand is a clock / command line launcher applet for Emerge Desktop. By default it displays the date and time in a configurable format.

When the left mouse button is clicked on the text, it allows for the typing in of a command to execute.

emergeHotkeys 
emergeHotkeys is the hotkey applet of Emerge Desktop. It defines a set of hotkeys which allow quick access to Emerge Desktop functions and other applications.

emergeLauncher 
emergeLauncher provides a "Quick Launch" applet for Emerge Desktop. It displays icons of applications in a movable, resizable window.

emergePower 
emergePower reports the status of battery power for laptops computers, in a movable and resizable window.

emergeSysMon 
emergeSysMon reports the CPU usage, the Commit Charge, The Physical Memory Usage, and the Pagefile Usage in a movable, resizable window.

emergeVWM 
emergeVWM is Emerge Desktop's "Virtual Window Manager" applet. It allows the user to switch monitor views between different virtual "desktops", and displays a grid of corresponding mini-windows in a movable and resizable window.

Versions 
Version 5 added native 64-bit support, theming, dynamic positioning and support for 'Run As'. Also, several new applets were added, such as emergeSysMon, a system resource monitor; emergePower, a battery charge monitor; reg2xml, settings converter to new XML format. The shell is capable to run as self-contained now. There are also numerous bug fixes.

See also 

 Shell (computing)
 Windows shell replacement

External links
 Official website
 Emerge Desktop at Sourceforge.net
 Emerge Desktop at DeviantArt.com
 Emerge Desktop review at the Technology Cooler
 Five Best Desktop Customization Tools (Lifehacker)
 Versatile Underground - [How To] Use Emerge Desktop – A Novice’s Guide to Greatness
 emergeDesktop on CNET
 emergeDesktop on Customize.Org!

References

Desktop shell replacement
Windows-only free software